Benson Polytechnic High School is a technical public high school in the Portland Public Schools district. It is temporarily located in Portland's Lents neighborhood while a renovation project is underway at its  campus in the Central Eastside commercial area of Portland, Oregon, United States. Students are given a special emphasis in a technical area. The school is a member of SkillsUSA and Health Occupations Students of America.

History of Benson

Benson's predecessor 
Benson Polytechnic High School began in 1908 as the Portland School of Trades in the Atkinson Building at 11th and Davis in Northwest Portland. It was established to give "boys who wished to enter a trade a better opportunity than do shops and factories of the present time." Any boy from Portland who was at least fourteen years old, or who was a grammar school graduate, could attend. The course of study was three years. Students could also attend night school and/or summer sessions at the trade school.

In 1909, a course of study for girls was added, with classes in sewing, cooking, millinery, and homemaking. The Portland School of Trades was coeducational until 1913, when the girls' departments were moved to the original Lincoln High School.

Beginnings and World War I 
The Portland School Board voted to change the school's name to Benson Polytechnic High School after civic leader and philanthropist Simon Benson gave $100,000 in 1915, with a stipulation that at least the same amount of money be spent by the Portland School District to start the school. Six blocks of land at Northeast 12th and Hoyt were purchased and a building was built, and the new Benson Polytechnic School opened its doors on September 4, 1917. The building was designed by Floyd Naramore. Portable classrooms were required early on and were still used into the 1950s.

Mr. Benson gave the student body $10,000 during World War I, and the first Tech Show was presented to the Portland community. Benson Polytechnic School grew rapidly in course offerings and in student population. In 1920, the printing department was set up and the school paper, the Tech Pep, was published.

In 1926, an aviation department was added to the school.

Benson Polytechnic School served not only the educational needs of the city's youth, but also the defense needs of a nation at war. Shortly after World War I, beginning in 1919, the federal government contracted with the school, and 50 disabled soldiers were educated.

KBPS radio 

In May 1921, the Benson Polytechnic School received a government license to operate "Technical and Training School" station with the call sign 7YK. This station utilized a spark transmitter, which was limited to Morse code dot-and-dash transmissions. In October 1923, the student body was issued a license for an experimental statiom, 7XAD.

In the early 1920s broadcasting was introduced, and arrangements were made to establish a school station. Equipment previously used by a short-lived station, KYG, was purchased by the student body in March 1923, and an application filed for a new broadcasting station to be operated by the students under the direction of teacher Fred Brainard. A broadcasting station license, with the call letters KFIF, was issued on March 23, 1923, to the Benson Polytechnic Institute. Equipment tests were begun in April, followed by an informal debut broadcast at 6:00 p.m. on May 4, 1923. A more formal station introduction, coinciding with the start of the fifth annual Benson Technical Show, was broadcast from 9:30 to 10:30 p.m on May 9, with scheduled addresses by school director W. F. Woodward, Benson principal C. E. Cleveland, and student body president Bill Norvell, plus singing by Marguerite Carney.

KFIF became KBPS in March 1930, and the District later took over ownership of the station. It has continued to this day to operate on the Benson campus and to be staffed by Benson students.

Expansion and  World War II 
By 1940, Benson had 2,800 students and was the largest school in Portland.

Due to the baby boom and passing of a $25 million building levy by the school district in 1947, 29 portable buildings dating from World War I were scheduled for replacement.

Modern times 

In 1953, the Portland School Board launched a five-year building program to upgrade Benson. A library and automotive wing were completed in 1954. The north shop wing was remodeled in 1955 and the south shop wing in 1960. Benson became co-educational once again in September 1973. Six females attended that year. When the health occupations program was moved from Washington High School to Benson in 1980, Benson's female population grew substantially.

An arson fire damaged offices and classrooms in the main section of Benson on January 2, 1991. Coincidentally, the School Board had already scheduled the Benson facility for major improvements. In 1991, a new health occupation wing, a new library, a new student services center, and a new band room were added, and halls and offices were modernized.

Benson is undergoing a $216.6 million modernization, which started in 2021 and is scheduled to end in 2024. During the renovation, Benson classes will take place at the campus of the former John Marshall High School in Portland's Lents neighborhood.

Academics 
In 2008, 88% of the school's seniors received a high school diploma. Of 271 students, 239 graduated, 27 dropped out, and five stayed for a fifth year.

Oregon moved to the Cohort System the next year to identify graduates, which yields a lower rate than years previous. 76% of students graduated from Benson in 2009, which was higher than the district average of 66%.

Benson is the only school in the Portland Public School district to graduate more minorities than white students.

Student profile 
As a magnet school, Benson was highly selective in the Portland area until fairly recently. Students were once required to complete an application for admissions, but this is no longer the case due to the requirements of the No Child Left Behind Act; instead a lottery is used to determine which students are admitted. As of the fall of 2008, there were 1134 students enrolled in Benson, and 61.7% qualified for free or reduced lunch.  

In the 2017–2018 school year, Benson's student population was 38.7% White, 25.5% Hispanic, 15.1% African American, 9.6% Asian, 0.6% Native American, 0.6% Pacific Islander, and 9.8% mixed race.

Curriculum 
In addition to a standard high school curriculum, students specialize in a self-selected major during the final two years of enrollment. Students may specialize in the following areas, provided by a partnership with SkillsUSA and Health Occupations Students of America (HOSA):

Arts & Communications Academy
Computer Science
Digital Media Productions
KBPS Radio Broadcasting

Health Occupations Academy
Dental Assisting
Medical Assisting
Nursing Assisting
Emergency Medicine

Industry & Engineering Academy
Automotive Technology
Building Construction Technology
Electrical Technology
Manufacturing Technology

Homebuilding program 
Benson is one of four Portland-area high schools (as well as Canby High School, Sherwood High School, and Forest Grove High School) that builds a single-family home in the community.

Athletics 
Benson's athletic teams are known as the "Benson Techmen", or "Techsters" for women's teams. The school competes in a variety of sports, and has won numerous district and state championships. Benson competes in the Portland Interscholastic League under 6A classification.

Men's Basketball Program 
The men's basketball team has been one of the most successful programs in Oregon. Benson has produced 30 plus D1 basketball recruits in program history. Some previous Techmen players have chosen to play at Hawaii, UCLA, USC, Nevada, Oregon State, Rhode Island, Stanford, and other schools. Three former players have been drafted into the NBA. Benson has won state titles in 1971, 1973, 1974, 1981, 1990. Earl Clark has been head coach since 2013.

State championships 
 Baseball: 1976
 Men's basketball: 1971, 1973, 1974, 1981, 1990
 Football: 1988
 Men's swimming: 1949
 Men's track and field: 1928, 1936, 1990, 1992, 1995, 2004
 Women's track and field: 1991, 1999, 2000, 2001, 2002, 2003, 2004
 Wrestling: 1927, 1928, 1929, 1930, 1931, 1932, 1933, 1936, 1939, 1982, 1983
 Women's basketball: 2019

Notable alumni 

 Aminé, rapper
 Mike Bivins, journalist reporting on civil unrest
 Tom Dodd, Major League Baseball player
 Jim Elliot, evangelical Christian killed in Ecuador on mission work
 A. C. Green, NBA player
 Alex Green, running back for the Green Bay Packers
 William A. Hilliard, former editor of The Oregonian
 Steve Horton, New York Times bestselling graphic novelist
 Matt Lattanzi, actor and dancer 
 Chris Leben, wrestler; retired professional mixed martial art fighter, formerly for the UFC
 Joel David Moore, actor
 Alex Nimo, USSF Division 2 Professional League, Portland Timbers (USL)
 Henry F. Phillips, inventor of Phillips-Head screw and screwdriver
 Kim Rhodes, actress
 Lendon Smith, pediatrician, author, and television personality
 Mfon Udoka, Nigerian Olympian
 Richard Washington, NBA, Kansas City Kings

References

External links 

 Benson Polytechnic High School Alumni Association
 Tech Pep school newspaper

High schools in Portland, Oregon
Educational institutions established in 1916
Schools accredited by the Northwest Accreditation Commission
Public high schools in Oregon
Magnet schools in Oregon
1916 establishments in Oregon
Portland Public Schools (Oregon)
Kerns, Portland, Oregon
Northeast Portland, Oregon
Portland Historic Landmarks